Events in the year 1991 in Bulgaria.

Incumbents 

 President: Zhelyu Zhelev
 Prime Minister: Dimitar Popov (from 1990 until November 8) Philip Dimitrov (from November 8 until 1992)

Events

Sports 

 January 22–27 – The 1991 European Figure Skating Championships was a senior-level international competition held in Sofia, Bulgaria.

Deaths
July 6 - Anton Yugov, prime minister (1956-1962)

References 

 
1990s in Bulgaria
Years of the 20th century in Bulgaria
Bulgaria
Bulgaria